The iPod Mini (stylized and marketed as the iPod mini) is a discontinued, smaller digital audio player that was designed and marketed by Apple Inc. While it was sold, it was the midrange model in Apple's iPod product line. It was announced on January 6, 2004, and released on February 20 of the same year. A second generation version was announced on February 23, 2005, and released immediately. While it was in production, it was one of the most popular electronic products on the market, with consumers often unable to find a retailer with the product in stock. The iPod Mini was discontinued on September 7, 2005 after 1 year of being made, and was replaced by the iPod Nano.

The iPod Mini used the touch-sensitive scroll wheel of the third generation iPod. However, instead of the four touch buttons located above the wheel, the buttons were redesigned as mechanical switches beneath the wheel itself—hence the name click wheel. To use one of the four buttons, the user physically pushes the edge of the wheel inward over one of the four labels. Like its predecessors, the wheel was developed for Apple by Synaptics. The click wheel was also used in the fourth, fifth and sixth generation iPods and the iPod Nano, from first generation through the fifth; however, in the Nano and 5G iPods onwards, the click wheel used was developed by Apple.

Above the wheel was a monochrome 138x110 LCD that displayed a menu or information about the selected track. Newer-generation iPods have since adopted color displays.

Models

Details
The two generations of iPod Mini were almost identical outside of minor cosmetic differences. The first generation model has gray control symbols on the click wheel, while those on the second generation matched the color of the body while also having the storage capacity etched on the back. Their major functional differences lay in their storage capacity and battery life. Both versions were 3.6x2.0x0.5 inches (91x51x13 mm) and weigh 3.6 ounces (102 grams). The case consists of anodized aluminium. First generation iPod Minis were available in five colors: silver, gold, pink, blue, and green. The gold model was dropped from the second generation range, likely due to its unpopularity. The pink, blue, and green models received brighter hues in the second generation but the silver model remained unchanged.

The iPod Mini used Microdrive hard drives (CompactFlash II) made by Hitachi and Seagate. First generation models were available in a 4 GB size, while second generation models were available in both 4 GB and 6 GB versions (quoted as capable of storing roughly 1,000 and 1,500 songs, respectively) and eventually the second generation had the capacity laser etched into the aluminum case. 

The battery life for the first generation iPod Mini was criticized for its 8 hour duration, similar to the third generation iPod that was available at the time. Apple addressed this problem in the second generation models by increasing the battery life to about 18 hours, at the cost of removing the FireWire and AC adapter cables to avoid increasing selling costs. A proprietary dock connector was provided on the bottom of the device for a connection to a computer's USB or FireWire port. The unit's battery could be charged during connection. Along the top it had a hold switch, a headphone jack, and a remote connector for accessories.

Like the iPod Nano, the iPod Mini supported MP3, AAC/M4A, WAV, AIFF, and Apple Lossless audio formats. It also retained the iPod's integration with iTunes and the iTunes Store, allowing for syncing between the software application and the iPod Mini.

Modification
Soon after the release of the iPod Mini, many third-party replacement batteries became available. By following one-of-many sets of online instructions detailing how to replace the battery, such as this one by iFixit, users could self replace the battery and so avoid having to send the iPod back to Apple, saving time and money. Many third-party batteries also claimed a higher capacity than the 450 mAh original stock battery – some claiming up to 1,300 mAh (though battery chemistry for Li-ion batteries has not advanced much during this period; it is highly unlikely that any would achieve such a capacity).  As of January 2021, the most commonly advertised capacities of third-party batteries are 500 mAh and 750 mAh.

The iPod Mini could be flashed to run iPodLinux or Rockbox firmware which has support for extra codecs, games and various other plugins and allowed music placed directly on the iPod to be played without using iTunes. Users have replaced the 4 or 6 GB Microdrive with high capacity 8, 16, 32, 64 and even 256 GB CompactFlash and SD cards. Aside from increased capacity, this has the advantage of increasing battery life and making the Mini more durable since CompactFlash cards are solid-state with no moving parts.

iPod Nano

On September 7, 2005, Apple released the first generation iPod Nano. The Nano used flash memory to accomplish an even thinner casing, and featured a color screen. The headphone jack was moved to the bottom of the device, the dock connector shifted-off center, and the 4-pin remote connector was removed, among other changes. This caused the iPod Mini to be replaced by the iPod Nano.

References

External links

iPod Mini specifications, both generations
Video of Jobs launching the iPod Mini at Macworld 2004

Mini
ITunes
Computer-related introductions in 2004
Products introduced in 2004
Products and services discontinued in 2005
Discontinued Apple Inc. products
Digital audio players